An ADR rose is a winner in the German ADR rose trial (Allgemeine Deutsche Rosenneuheitenprüfung). No chemical pesticides have been allowed since 1997 and breeders often describe the trial as among the most challenging in the world. The trial is set up by a working group that includes the Bund deutscher Baumschulen (German nurseries association), rose breeders, and eleven independent trial stations in Germany. The trial results are analyzed by the Bundessortenamt (Federal Office of Plant Varieties).

Roses are tested over three years and criteria analyzed include disease resistance, hardiness, attractiveness, and habit. About 50 cultivars are judged annually and more than 2000 cultivars have been tested since the award's creation in the 1950s. Roses that no longer fulfill quality standards have their certificate removed. As of November 2013, 161 cultivars are recognized.

List of ADR roses

List of former ADR roses

See also

List of Award of Garden Merit roses
Rose Hall of Fame

Footnotes

References

External links

ADR - Performance Testing of New Rose Varieties in Germany

Lists of cultivars
Plant awards